Grauer's cuckooshrike (Ceblepyris graueri) is a species of bird in the family Campephagidae.
It is found in Democratic Republic of the Congo and Uganda.
Its natural habitat is subtropical or tropical moist montane forests.
It is threatened by habitat loss.

The name commemorates the German zoologist  Rudolf Grauer who collected natural history specimens in the Belgian Congo.

References

Grauer's cuckooshrike
Birds of Sub-Saharan Africa
Grauer's cuckooshrike
Taxonomy articles created by Polbot